Mauricio Alegre-Ramirez (born 5 November 1975) is a Mexican retired footballer who played professionally in the USL A-League and the second Major Indoor Soccer League.

Born in Mexico City, Alegre grew up in Tijuana.  In April 1996, he signed with the San Diego Sockers of the Continental Indoor Soccer League.  In 1997, he joined the San Diego Flash in the USISL A-League, playing for them until 2000.  In March 2001, Alegre signed a one-year contract with the Flash.  However, he instead spent the season with the San Diego Sockers in the World Indoor Soccer League.  He rejoined the Sockers in 2003 when they played in the second Major Indoor Soccer League.  He finished his career in 2004 with the Wisconsin Rebels of the USL Premier Development League.

References

Living people
1975 births
Footballers from Mexico City
Association football midfielders
San Diego Sockers (CISL) players
San Diego Flash players
San Diego Sockers (2001–2004) players
Wisconsin Rebels players
Continental Indoor Soccer League players
A-League (1995–2004) players
World Indoor Soccer League players
Major Indoor Soccer League (2001–2008) players
USL League Two players
Mexican expatriate footballers
Expatriate soccer players in the United States
Mexican expatriate sportspeople in the United States
Sportspeople from Tijuana
Mexican footballers